Mahmoud Al Sayed (born May 10, 1985, in Alexandria) is an Egyptian footballer (soccer) goalkeeper.

In July 2015, Mahmoud made his debut with El Ittihad Alexandria in 2014–15 Egyptian Premier League match against Smouha SC.

References

External links
 

1985 births
Living people
Egyptian footballers
Association football goalkeepers
Sportspeople from Alexandria
Al Ittihad Alexandria Club players